Andrew Scott was born in Canning Town, East London and was drummer with The Tickets with his brother Ken. Scott also appeared solo as The Todd Band. He was a founding member of Wasted Youth and also appeared on drums for The Cockney Rejects.

References

English rock drummers
Possibly living people
Year of birth missing (living people)